

The Comte AC-3 was a 1920s Swiss bomber/transport aircraft produced by Flugzeugbau A. Comte.

Design and development
In November 1928, as a response to increasing tensions and clashes between troops in the Gran Chaco border region between Bolivia and Paraguay, Bolivia placed an order with Alfred Comte, the owner of a small Swiss aircraft manufacturer for three long-range bomber-transport aircraft, using funds collected by popular subscription.

The AC-3 was a high-wing semicantilever monoplane of mixed construction. It was fabric covered with a conventional tail unit. It had three open cockpits, one in the nose for a gunner or observer, one forward of the wing for a pilot, and one on the upper rear fuselage for a rear gunner. An unconventional engine layout had two 447 kW (600 hp) Hispano-Suiza inline piston engines in tandem supported on eight struts above the fuselage. The installation had to be high enough to allow clearance for the two (one pusher, one tractor) propellers above the fuselage. A hatch in the port side allowed cargo or troops to be carried in the main cabin.

The new aircraft was too large to be built in Comte's existing factory, (the AC-3 was the largest aircraft ever to be developed and built in Switzerland) and forced Comte to build a new hangar just for the AC-3. It made its maiden flight from Dübendorf airfield on 22 February 1930. The aircraft failed to meet its expected top speed, and as a result it was refitted with four-bladed propellers instead of the original two-bladed items. A collapse in the price of tin resulted in severe financial problems in Bolivia, and the military junta ruling Bolivia cancelled the order for the three Comte bombers, with only the first example being built, which was dismantled in 1935.

Operators

Bolivian Air Force

Specifications

See also

References

Bibliography
 

1920s Swiss military aircraft
Twin-engined push-pull aircraft
AC-3
High-wing aircraft
Aircraft first flown in 1930